Moon over Parador is a 1988 American romantic comedy film, starring Richard Dreyfuss, Raul Julia and Sônia Braga. It is a remake of the 1939 film The Magnificent Fraud, based on the unpublished short story entitled "Caviar for His Excellency" by Charles G. Booth.

Plot
The film follows the exploits of film actor Jack Noah, who is filming in the small, fictional South American country of Parador when Paradorian President Alfonse Simms, a dictator, invites him and the cast and crew to the film at their palace. Simms seems delighted at Jack's imitation of him.

Suddenly, Alfonse Simms dies of a heart attack. Not wanting to lose his position in power, the president's right-hand man, Roberto Strausmann, forces Jack to take the 'role of a lifetime'—that of the dead president, as the two men look so much alike. Jack accepts, eventually winning over the people and even the dead president's mistress, Madonna (Braga). For over a year, the two bond, and she shows Jack how the people are suffering under the dictatorship, particularly at the iron hand of Roberto (the real power behind the scene and who continues the charade in order to become president himself) against the rebels.

Jack creates a plan where, in the middle of a show featuring Sammy Davis Jr, he (as Simms) is apparently gunned down by an assassin. Before dying, "Simms" accuses Roberto as the true enemy, leading to his lynching at the hands of the crowd. Inside a van, Jack escapes. Months later, he is telling the story to his friends, who do not believe him. Jack is happy to learn that Madonna led a revolution and is now the elected president of Parador.

Cast
 Richard Dreyfuss as Jack Noah / President Alphonse Simms
 Lorin Dreyfuss as The Real Alphonse Simms
 Raul Julia as Roberto Strausmann
 Sônia Braga as Madonna Mendez
 Dana Delany as Jenny
 Jonathan Winters as Ralph
 Fernando Rey as Alejandro
 Michael Greene as Clint
 Polly Holliday as Midge
 Milton Gonçalves as Carlo
 Charo as Madame Loop
 Marianne Sägebrecht as Magda Feldmarck
 Sammy Davis Jr. as himself
 Ike Pappas as himself
 Edward Asner as himself
 Reinhard Kolldehoff as Gunther Feldmarck

Production
Moon Over Parador was developed in part from plot elements contained in The Magnificent Fraud, a 1939 crime film directed by Robert Florey and distributed by Paramount Pictures.

In the beginning, while both President Alphonse Simms and Jack are in the scene, the president is played by Dreyfuss' older brother, Lorin.

During a scene where Jack has to address the crowd as the Paradorian dictator, he ad-libs his lines and uses the lyrics for the song "The Impossible Dream" from Man of La Mancha. Sammy Davis Jr.'s rendition of Parador's national anthem is sung against the music for "Bésame Mucho". The previous Paradorian National Anthem ("O Parador") is sung to the tune of "O Christmas Tree".

Director Mazursky appears uncredited in drag, playing Simms' mother. Mazursky's wife Betsy appears at a buffet table and asks, "Por favor, is it safe to eat this lettuce here?" His daughter, Jill, plays the assistant director of the second film crew to shoot in Parador.

Reception
On review aggregator website Rotten Tomatoes, the film holds an approval rating of 42%, based on 12 reviews, and an average rating of 4.8/10.

Variety called the film "[an] elaborate farce", but also said that "[it] has moments of true hilarity emerging only fitfully from a ponderous production". 

In her 1988 review for The New York Times, film and literary critic Janet Maslin found the story's setting visually appealing but the production's success as a comedy decidedly lacking:

Awards and nominations
Golden Globe Award
Nominated, "Best Performance by an Actor in a Supporting Role in a Motion Picture" - Raul Julia
Nominated, "Best Performance by an Actress in a Supporting Role in a Motion Picture" - Sônia Braga

See also
The Magnificent Fraud
Dave (film)

References

External links

1988 films
Films directed by Paul Mazursky
Films scored by Maurice Jarre
1988 romantic comedy films
American romantic comedy films
Films about actors
Films about Latin American military dictatorships
Remakes of American films
Films shot in Rio de Janeiro (city)
Films shot in Salvador, Bahia
Films shot in Ouro Preto
Films shot in New York City
Films set in South America
Films set in a fictional country
Universal Pictures films
Films about lookalikes
1980s English-language films
1980s American films